Slippin: Ten Years with the Bloods is a 2005 American documentary written and directed by Joachim Schroeder and Tommy Sowards.  Debuting at the 2005 Tribeca film festival the film follows a few members of the notorious Los Angeles gang Bloods for 10 years, showing what life is really like on the inside.

Cast
K.K. Calvin as himself
Jumbo Chris as himself
Dig Dug Douglas as himself
C.K. Michael Johnson as himself
Low Down Lemar as himself

External links
 
 

2005 films
2005 documentary films
American documentary films
Documentary films about Los Angeles
Documentary films about African-American gangs
Bloods
2000s English-language films
2000s American films